Roberts Štelmahers (born November 19, 1974) is a Latvian retired professional basketball player, who played the point guard position. Štelmahers was a member of the Latvia national basketball team from 1992 to 2005 participating in four EuroBasket final tournaments in 1997, 2001, 2003 and 2005. He has played a total of 144 games for his national team. He was most recently the head coach of the ERA Nymburk of the National Basketball League.

Playing career
Štelmahers grew up with ASK Riga youth team, he made his debut with Rīgas ASK during the 1990–91 season. After that he signed Bonus Riga and played there till the 1994–95 championship. Then he signed with ASK/Broceni/Riga for 1995–96 season and played there until the 1997–98 championship. Štelmahers moved to Russia for the 1998–99 season, signed by Avtodor Saratov. He was released on late December due to club's financial problems and in January moved to Poland, signed by Zielona Góra. He stayed in Poland and signed with Śląsk Wrocław for the 1999–00 season. For the 2000–01 season, Štelmahers moved to Turkey and signed with Pınar Karşıyaka. He stayed in Turkey and played for Ülkerspor in the 2001–02 season. After that Štelmahers moved to Slovenia and played two seasons in KK Union Olimpija. In 2004 he moved back to Baltics and signed with Lithuanian powerhouse Lietuvos Rytas where he stayed until the 2007–08 championship. After a break due to an injury he signed with his first team Rīgas ASK in January 2009. He retired in 2009.

Coaching career 
On July 4, 2022, he signed as head coach of ZZ Leiden of the BNXT League. The same month, on July 30, Nymburk announced Stelmahers as their new coach, a move criticised by Leiden's management. 

On July 30, 2022, he has signed with ERA Nymburk of the National Basketball League.

Euroleague career statistics

|-
| style="text-align:left;"| 2001–02
| style="text-align:left;"| Ülkerspor
| 19 || 13 || 20.0 || .462 || .341 || .791 || 1.6 || 1.5 || .9 || .0 || 6.5 || 7.3
|-
| style="text-align:left;"| 2002–03
| style="text-align:left;"| Union Olimpija
| 20 || 7 || 24.1 || .520 || .219 || .825 || 2.0 || 2.3 || 1.0 || .0 || 8.6 || 8.6
|-
| style="text-align:left;"| 2003–04
| style="text-align:left;"| Union Olimpija
| 16 || 15 || 30.3 || .438 || .352 || .844 || 2.4 || 3.1 || 1.1 || .0 || 11.6 || 12.6
|-
| style="text-align:left;"| 2005–06
| style="text-align:left;"| Lietuvos Rytas
| 16 || 16 || 28.1 || .417 || .418 || .771 || 2.6 || 3.4 || .9 || .0 || 10.1 || 10.1

Achievements
 1995–96 Latvian National Championship (ASK/Brocēni)
 1996–97 Latvian National Championship (ASK/Brocēni/LMT)
 1997–98 Latvian National Championship (ASK/Brocēni/LMT)
 1999-00 Polish National Championship (Śląsk Wrocław)
 1999-00 Polish Supercup (Śląsk Wrocław)
 2000–01 Turkish President's Cup Cup (Ülkerspor)
 2002–03 Slovenian National Cup (KK Union Olimpija)
 2002–03 Slovenian SuperCup (KK Union Olimpija)
 2003–04 Slovenian National Championship (KK Union Olimpija)
 2003–04 Slovenian SuperCup (KK Union Olimpija)
 2004–05 ULEB Cup Championship (Lietuvos Rytas Vilnius)
 2005–06 Baltic League Championship (Lietuvos Rytas Vilnius)
 2005–06 Lithuanian National Championship (Lietuvos Rytas Vilnius)
 2006–07 Baltic League Championship (Lietuvos Rytas Vilnius)

References

External links
 Roberts Štelmahers at Euroleague.net

1974 births
Living people
ABA League players
ASK Riga players
Basket Zielona Góra players
Basketball players from Riga
BC Avtodor Saratov players
BC Rytas coaches
BC Rytas players
Karşıyaka basketball players
KK Olimpija players
Latvian basketball coaches
Latvian expatriate basketball people in Estonia
Latvian expatriate basketball people in Poland
Latvian expatriate basketball people in Turkey
Latvian men's basketball players
Point guards
Ülker G.S.K. basketball players